List of English words of Scots origin is a list of English language words of Scots origin. See also "List of English words of Scottish Gaelic origin", which contains many words which were borrowed via Highland Scots.

BlackmailA form of extortion carried out by the Border Reivers, borrowed into English with less violent connotations.
blatant
Bonspiel
caddie or caddy
cannyAlso Northern English. From English can in older sense of "to know how."
clanBorrowed from Gaelic clann (family, stock, off-spring).
convene Borrowed from French convenir, from Latin convenire.
cosy
firthDerived from Old Icelandic fjǫrdic (see fjord)
glamourMeaning magic, enchantment, spell. From English grammar and Scottish gramarye (occult learning or scholarship).
gloamingMiddle English (Scots) gloming, from Old English glomung "twilight", from OE glom
golf
glengarry(or Glengarry bonnet) A brimless Scottish cap with a crease running down the crown, often with ribbons at the back. Named after the title of the clan chief Alexander Ranaldson MacDonell of Glengarry (1771–1828), who invented it.
gumptionCommon sense or shrewdness.
halloween
haver or haiverTo talk nonsense. Scottish and North English dialect.
laddieA boy.
lassieA girl.
linksSandy, rolling ground, from Old English hlinc (ridge).
pernicketyFrom pernicky.
minging literally "stinking", from Scots "to ming".
plaidFrom Gaelic plaide or simply a development of ply, to fold, giving plied then plaid after the Scots pronunciation.
ponyBorrowed from obsolete French poulenet (little foal) from Latin pullāmen.
raid
sconeProbably from Dutch schoon.
shinnyPond or street hockey in Canada. From an alternative name for the Scots sport shinty.
skulduggeryFrom Scots sculduddery
tweedCloth being woven in a twilled rather than a plain pattern. from tweel
weeSmall, tiny, minute.
wow Exclamation
wraith

See also
 List of English words of Scottish Gaelic origin
 Lists of English words of international origin

References

Scots
English words of Scots origin
English words of Scots origin